Dick Vorisek (February 21, 1918 – November 7, 1989) was an American sound engineer. He was nominated for an Academy Award in the category Best Sound for the film Reds. He worked on over 130 films between 1947 and 1988.

Selected filmography
 Reds (1981)

References

External links

1918 births
1989 deaths
American audio engineers
People from the Bronx
Engineers from New York City
20th-century American engineers